The governor of Aklan is the local chief executive of the province of Aklan, Philippines.

Governors

References

Governors of provinces of the Philippines
Politics of Aklan